John Horsfall, a Yorkshireman, was Bishop of Ossory  from 1586 until his death in 1609.

Notes

1576 deaths
16th-century Anglican bishops in Ireland
Anglican bishops of Ossory
Clergy from Yorkshire